Benjamin Rutten (born 28 May 1983) is a former Australian rules football player and coach. He was the senior coach of the Essendon Football Club in the Australian Football League (AFL) in 2021 and 2022. As a player, he played for the Adelaide Football Club and was known for his size, strength and ability to contain some of the game's best forwards.

Playing career

Adelaide 
Recruited from South Australian National Football League (SANFL) club West Adelaide in the 2001 Rookie Draft, Rutten made his AFL debut in 2003 for Adelaide Crows as a forward, joining an elite club of players who have goaled with each of their first three kicks. Rutten was moved to defence and made a name for himself as a tough full-back, coming of age in the 2005 AFL season, where he was part of Adelaide's sturdy defensive unit, and often held his opponents to two goals or less. This earned Rutten All-Australian selection in 2005, and Rutten became an integral part of Adelaide's defence for the rest of his career. He and fellow All-Australian defender Nathan Bock formed one of the most capable defensive partnerships in the AFL prior to Bock's transfer to the Gold Coast Suns.

Rutten gave away the controversial game-deciding free kick in the 2009 semi-final by holding the arm of Collingwood forward Jack Anthony who scored Collingwood's winning goal in the last 55 seconds, which ended Adelaide's season.

On 1 July 2014, Rutten announced that he would retire at the end of the 2014 season, hinting a possible move into coaching. He played his last game against St Kilda on 31 August 2014, scoring his ninth and final AFL goal in the last kick of his career.

Coaching career

Richmond
On 10 September 2014, Rutten became an assistant coach at Richmond under senior coach Damien Hardwick, serving as the club's defence coach. Rutten was also part of the coaching group in the club's 2017 AFL Grand Final win. Rutten left the Richmond Football Club at the end of the 2018 season.

Essendon
On 24 August 2018, Essendon announced Rutten would be joining their coaching department as an assistant coach under senior coach John Worsfold for the 2019 season, Rutten served as assistant coach in the position of the Team Defence and Key Position Coach.

At the end of the 2020 season, Essendon senior coach Worsfold handed over the coaching reins to his assistant coach Rutten as part of the planned transition. Rutten then officially became the senior coach of Essendon Football Club. In Rutten's first season as Essendon Football Club senior coach in the 2021 season, he guided Essendon to finish eighth on the ladder, therefore making the finals. They were eliminated by the eventual runners-up, the Western Bulldogs in an elimination final.

Following an unsuccessful 2022 season in which Essendon under Rutten won seven out of 22 games, David Barham replaced Paul Brasher as Essendon's club president on 15 August and immediately attempted to sign four-time Hawthorn premiership coach Alastair Clarkson, all whilst Rutten was still under contract for 2023. Several media outlets subsequently described Rutten's position as untenable and expected him to be sacked during that Sunday's board meeting. The next day, Essendon suffered a 66-point round 23 loss to Richmond, with Rutten stating in his post-match press conference that he "deserved better" and that Essendon needed "to come together as a whole football club and stick to a plan." The following day, Rutten was sacked as senior coach of Essendon. Rutten was then replaced by Brad Scott as senior coach of Essendon Football Club.

Return to Richmond
On 16 September 2022, it was announced that Rutten returned to Richmond as an assistant coach under senior coach Damien Hardwick for the 2023 season.

Statistics

|- style="background:#eaeaea;"
| 2003
| 
| 25 || 2 || 3 || 0 || 6 || 7 || 13 || 7 || 0 || 1.5 || 0.0 || 3.0 || 3.5 || 6.5 || 3.5 || 0.0
|- 
| 2004
| 
| 25 || 9 || 0 || 0 || 55 || 50 || 105 || 40 || 10 || 0.0 || 0.0 || 6.1 || 5.6 || 11.7 || 4.4 || 1.1
|- style="background:#eaeaea;"
| 2005
| 
| 25 || 25 || 1 || 0 || 143 || 137 || 280 || 95 || 27 || 0.0 || 0.0 || 5.7 || 5.5 || 11.2 || 3.8 || 1.1
|- 
| 2006
| 
| 25 || 24 || 1 || 2 || 175 || 158 || 333 || 135 || 35 || 0.0 || 0.1 || 7.3 || 6.6 || 13.9 || 5.6 || 1.5
|- style="background:#eaeaea;"
| 2007
| 
| 25 || 20 || 0 || 0 || 122 || 137 || 259 || 113 || 24 || 0.0 || 0.0 || 6.1 || 6.9 || 13.0 || 5.7 || 1.2
|- 
| 2008
| 
| 25 || 22 || 0 || 1 || 157 || 182 || 339 || 147 || 20 || 0.0 || 0.0 || 7.1 || 8.3 || 15.4 || 6.7 || 0.9
|- style="background:#eaeaea;"
| 2009
| 
| 25 || 24 || 1 || 0 || 164 || 204 || 368 || 142 || 29 || 0.0 || 0.0 || 6.8 || 8.5 || 15.3 || 5.9 || 1.2
|- 
| 2010
| 
| 25 || 22 || 0 || 0 || 128 || 212 || 340 || 128 || 46 || 0.0 || 0.0 || 5.8 || 9.6 || 15.5 || 5.8 || 2.1
|- style="background:#eaeaea;"
| 2011
| 
| 25 || 21 || 0 || 0 || 143 || 174 || 317 || 107 || 30 || 0.0 || 0.0 || 6.8 || 8.3 || 15.1 || 5.1 || 1.4
|- 
| 2012
| 
| 25 || 25 || 2 || 1 || 148 || 136 || 284 || 125 || 40 || 0.1 || 0.0 || 5.9 || 5.4 || 11.4 || 5.0 || 1.6
|- style="background:#eaeaea;"
| 2013
| 
| 25 || 21 || 0 || 1 || 140 || 132 || 272 || 114 || 24 || 0.0 || 0.0 || 6.7 || 6.3 || 13.0 || 5.4 || 1.1
|- 
| 2014
| 
| 25 || 14 || 1 || 0 || 72 || 80 || 152 || 52 || 24 || 0.1 || 0.0 || 5.1 || 5.7 || 10.9 || 3.7 || 1.7
|- class="sortbottom"
! colspan=3| Career
! 229
! 9
! 5
! 1453
! 1609
! 3062
! 1205
! 309
! 0.0
! 0.0
! 6.3
! 7.0
! 13.3
! 5.3
! 1.3
|}

References

External links

1983 births
Adelaide Football Club players
All-Australians (AFL)
Living people
West Adelaide Football Club players
Australian rules footballers from Adelaide
Australian people of Dutch descent
Australian people of New Zealand descent
Happy Valley Football Club players
Adelaide Football Club (SANFL) players